Golubov (masculine) or Golubova (feminine) is Russian surname:
Aleksandrs Golubovs (1959–2010), Latvian politician
Dmitri Golubov (born 1985), Russian professional footballer
Dmitri Golubov (born 1983), Ukrainian politician

Russian-language surnames